Harry Reynolds may refer to:

 Harry Reynolds (EastEnders), fictional character
 Harry Reynolds (Home and Away), fictional character
 Butch Reynolds (born 1964), American 400 meters sprinter
 Harry Reynolds (cyclist) (1874–1940), Irish cyclist
 Harry Reynolds (ice hockey) (1892–1977), Canadian ice hockey player
 Harry Reynolds (film editor), editor on the film Four Walls
 Robert Smith (Medal of Honor) (born Harry Reynolds, 1847–1930), American soldier and Medal of Honor recipient 
 Harry Reynolds, lead vocalist for English experimental rock band Classically Handsome Brutes
 Harry Reynolds (Australian footballer), Australian football player

See also
 Henry Reynolds (disambiguation)
 Harold Reynolds (disambiguation)